Mary River may refer to:

 Mary River (Alaska), US
 Mary River (Northern Territory), Australia
 Mary River (Queensland), Australia
 Mary River cod
 Mary River turtle, a species of turtle endemic to the Mary River in Queensland, Australia
 Mary River (Western Australia)
 Mary River (Nunavut), Canada
 Mary River Mine

See also
 Saint Mary's River (disambiguation)
 Marys River (disambiguation)
 Mary (disambiguation)